In mathematical finance, the Black–Scholes equation is a partial differential equation (PDE) governing the price evolution of a European call or European put under the Black–Scholes model. Broadly speaking, the term may refer to a similar PDE that can be derived for a variety of options, or more generally, derivatives.

For a European call or put on an underlying stock paying no dividends, the equation is:

The key financial insight behind the equation is that, under the model assumption of a frictionless market, one can perfectly hedge the option by buying and selling the underlying asset in just the right way and consequently “eliminate risk". This hedge, in turn, implies that there is only one right price for the option, as returned by the Black–Scholes formula.

Financial interpretation of the Black–Scholes PDE

The equation has a concrete interpretation that is often used by practitioners and is the basis for the common derivation given in the next subsection. The equation can be rewritten in the form:

The left-hand side consists of a "time decay" term, the change in derivative value with respect to time, called theta, and a term involving the second spatial derivative gamma, the convexity of the derivative value with respect to the underlying value. The right-hand side is the riskless return from a long position in the derivative and a short position consisting of  shares of the underlying.

Black and Scholes' insight was that the portfolio represented by the right-hand side is riskless: thus the equation says that the riskless return over any infinitesimal time interval can be expressed as the sum of theta and a term incorporating gamma. For an option, theta is typically negative, reflecting the loss in value due to having less time for exercising the option (for a European call on an underlying without dividends, it is always negative). Gamma is typically positive and so the gamma term reflects the gains in holding the option. The equation states that over any infinitesimal time interval the loss from theta and the gain from the gamma term must offset each other so that the result is a return at the riskless rate.

From the viewpoint of the option issuer, e.g. an investment bank, the gamma term is the cost of hedging the option. (Since gamma is the greatest when the spot price of the underlying is near the strike price of the option, the seller's hedging costs are the greatest in that circumstance.)

Derivation of the Black–Scholes PDE
The following derivation is given in Hull's Options, Futures, and Other Derivatives. That, in turn, is based on the classic argument in the original Black–Scholes paper.

Per the model assumptions above, the price of the underlying asset (typically a stock) follows a geometric Brownian motion. That is

where W is a stochastic variable (Brownian motion). Note that W, and consequently its infinitesimal increment dW, represents the only source of uncertainty in the price history of the stock. Intuitively, W(t) is a process that "wiggles up and down" in such a random way that its expected change over any time interval is 0. (In addition, its variance over time T is equal to T; see ); a good discrete analogue for W is a simple random walk.

The payoff of an option (or any derivative contingent to stock )  at maturity is known. By Itô's lemma for two variables we have

Now consider a certain portfolio, called the delta-hedge portfolio, consisting of being short one option and long  shares at time . The value of these holdings is

Over the time period , the total profit or loss from changes in the values of the holdings is (but see note below):

Now discretize the equations for dS/S and dV by replacing differentials with deltas:

and appropriately substitute them into the expression for :

Notice that the  term has vanished. Thus uncertainty has been eliminated and the portfolio is effectively riskless. The rate of return on this portfolio must be equal to the rate of return on any other riskless instrument; otherwise, there would be opportunities for arbitrage. Now assuming the risk-free rate of return is  we must have over the time period 

Simplifying, we arrive at the celebrated Black–Scholes partial differential equation:

Different pricing formulae for various options will arise from the choice of payoff function at expiry and appropriate boundary conditions.

Technical note: A subtlety obscured by the discretization approach above is that the infinitesimal change in the portfolio value was due to only the infinitesimal changes in the values of the assets being held, not changes in the positions in the assets. In other words, the portfolio was assumed to be self-financing.

Alternative derivation
Here is an alternative derivation that can be utilized in situations where it is initially unclear what the hedging portfolio should be. (For a reference, see 6.4 of Shreve vol II).

In the Black–Scholes model, assuming we have picked the risk-neutral probability measure, the underlying stock price S(t) is assumed to evolve as a geometric Brownian motion:

Since this stochastic differential equation (SDE) shows the stock price evolution is Markovian, any derivative on this underlying is a function of time t and the stock price at the current time, S(t). Then an application of Ito's lemma gives an SDE for the discounted derivative process , which should be a martingale. In order for that to hold, the drift term must be zero, which implies the Black—Scholes PDE.

This derivation is basically an application of the Feynman–Kac formula and can be attempted whenever the underlying asset(s) evolve according to given SDE(s).

Solving the Black–Scholes PDE
Once the Black–Scholes PDE, with boundary and terminal conditions, is derived for a derivative, the PDE can be solved numerically using standard methods of numerical analysis, such as a type of finite difference method. In certain cases, it is possible to solve for an exact formula, such as in the case of a European call, which was done by Black and Scholes.

To do this for a call option, recall the PDE above has boundary conditions 

The last condition gives the value of the option at the time that the option matures. Other conditions are possible as S goes to 0 or infinity. For example, common conditions utilized in other situations are to choose delta to vanish as S goes to 0 and gamma to vanish as S goes to infinity; these will give the same formula as the conditions above (in general, differing boundary conditions will give different solutions, so some financial insight should be utilized to pick suitable conditions for the situation at hand).

The solution of the PDE gives the value of the option at any earlier time, . To solve the PDE we recognize that it is a Cauchy–Euler equation which can be transformed into a diffusion equation by introducing the change-of-variable transformation

Then the Black–Scholes PDE becomes a diffusion equation

The terminal condition  now becomes an initial condition

where H(x) is the Heaviside step function. The Heaviside function corresponds to enforcement of the boundary data in the S, t coordinate system that requires when t = T,

assuming both S, K > 0. With this assumption, it is equivalent to the max function over all x in the real numbers, with the exception of x = 0. The equality above between the max function and the Heaviside function is in the sense of distributions because it does not hold for x = 0. Though subtle, this is important because the Heaviside function need not be finite at x = 0, or even defined for that matter. For more on the value of the Heaviside function at x = 0, see the section "Zero Argument" in the article Heaviside step function.

Using the standard convolution method for solving a diffusion equation given an initial value function, u(x, 0), we have

which, after some manipulation, yields

where  is the standard normal cumulative distribution function and

These are the same solutions (up to time translation) that were obtained by Fischer Black in 1976.

Reverting  to the original set of variables yields the above stated solution to the Black–Scholes equation.

The asymptotic condition can now be realized.

which gives simply S when reverting to the original coordinates.

References

Mathematical finance
Financial models